Tsele Natsok Rangdröl (1608-?) was an important master of the Kagyü and Nyingma schools of Tibetan Buddhism. He is also known as Tsele Gotsangpa.

References

Rangdröl, Tsele Natsok. Empowerment. Translated by Erik Pema Kunsang. Boudhanath: Rangjung Yeshe Publications, 1993. 
Rangdröl, Tsele Natsok. Lamp of Mahamudra. Translated by Erik Pema Kunsang. Boudhanath: Rangjung Yeshe Publications, 1993. 
Rangdröl, Tsele Natsok. Mirror of Mindfulness. Translated by Erik Pema Kunsang. Boudhanath: Rangjung Yeshe Publications, 1993. 
Guenther, Herbert V. (1992). Meditation Differently: Phenomenological Psychological Aspects of Tibetan Buddhist (Mahamudra and Snying-Thig Practices from Original Tibetan Sources. Delhi: Motilal Banarsidass Publishers (repr. 2005).  (hardbound).

External links
 sna tshogs rang grol - TBRC P1687
 Tsele Natsok Rangdrol - at Rangjung Yeshe Wiki

Nyingma lamas
Kagyu lamas